Yugntruf – Youth for Yiddish  is an organization of young Yiddish-speaking adults that is dedicated to the spread of the Yiddish language through various programs and events. It was founded by David Roskies and Gavi Trunk under the guidance of the late Dr. Mordkhe Schaechter in 1964.

Name 

Yugntruf means “call of [the] youth” 
and “call to youth”.

Activities 

It hosts events such as
 the Yidish-Tog (“Yiddish Day”), a day in New York in which programs are run in Yiddish.
 the Svive Project, in which groups of Yiddish speakers come together to read and discuss in Yiddish.   means “environment”.
 the week-long Yidish-Vokh (“Yiddish Week”) retreat, held in Copake, New York, in which participants spend an entire week conversing completely in Yiddish.

In addition, Yugntruf sponsors a literary magazine as well as the publishing of books for children in Yiddish. Many members of Yugntruf have decided to raise their children as Yiddish speakers.

References

External reference
 

Ashkenazi Jewish culture in Maryland
Ashkenazi Jewish culture in New York (state)
Jewish organizations
Jewish youth organizations
Jews and Judaism in Baltimore County, Maryland
Jews and Judaism in New York (state)
Reisterstown, Maryland
Yiddish culture in Maryland
Yiddish culture in New York (state)
Youth organizations established in 1964
Youth organizations based in the United States